Helen Elizabeth Hayes (born 8 August 1974) is a British Labour Party politician, who has been the Member of Parliament (MP) for Dulwich and West Norwood since the May 2015 general election.

Early life
Hayes attended Ormskirk Grammar School, a comprehensive secondary school based in Ormskirk, near Liverpool in the northwest of England. She was an undergraduate at Balliol College, Oxford.

After university, Hayes worked as a town planner. She became managing partner of her own town planning company, Urban Practitioners, before becoming a partner at London architectural practice Allies and Morrison.

Hayes is a Chartered Member of the Royal Town Planning Institute, a member of the King's College Hospital NHS Foundation Trust and is also a trustee of Turner Contemporary art gallery in Margate.

Political career 
Before being elected as an MP, Hayes was elected as a Councillor for the College ward of Southwark Council in 2010 and in 2014. Following her election as an MP in May 2015 she held both roles for 10 months before resigning as a Councillor in March 2016 to focus on her Parliamentary duties.

Hayes has served on the Housing, Communities and Local Government Committee since July 2015.

She supported Remain in the EU referendum in June 2016 and voted against the triggering of Article 50 in February 2017.

In 2018, Hayes criticised the closure of two Royal Mail delivery offices in her constituency.

She has signed a range of Early day motions in Parliament since her election. These range from calling on the Government to better protect and support Transgender rights, and for the adoption of a public health approach to drugs policy in the UK.

Following the election of Keir Starmer as Labour Leader, she was promoted as Shadow Minister for the Cabinet office in April 2020. Hayes resigned her role as a Shadow Minister on 30 December 2020 in order to abstain on the Future Trade Agreement between the UK and the EU.

In the November 2021 British shadow cabinet reshuffle, she returned to the frontbench as Shadow Minister for Children and Early Years, replacing Tulip Siddiq.

Personal life
Hayes is married to Ben Jupp; the couple have two children. Her sister-in law is Rachel Jupp, editor of the BBC current affairs series, Panorama.

References

External links

Listing on Southwark Council website

1974 births
Living people
Alumni of Balliol College, Oxford
Female members of the Parliament of the United Kingdom for English constituencies
Labour Party (UK) MPs for English constituencies
Councillors in the London Borough of Southwark
UK MPs 2015–2017
UK MPs 2017–2019
UK MPs 2019–present
21st-century British women politicians
21st-century English women
21st-century English people
People educated at Ormskirk Grammar School
Women councillors in England